XB1, XB-1, or vaXB1riant, may refer to:

Vehicles
 Huff-Daland XB-1, or Keystone XB-1, a prototype bomber aircraft built for the United States Army Air Corps
 Engineering Division XB-1, or Dayton-Wright XB-1, an American version of the Bristol F.2 Fighter aircraft
 Buell XB1, a motorcycle by Buell Motorcycle Company
 XB-1 Baby Boom, an American supersonic aircraft by Boom Technology

Video Games
 Xbox One, the third installment in the Microsoft Xbox series of home video game consoles
 Xbox (console), the first installment in the Microsoft Xbox series of home video game consoles

Other uses
 1993 XB1 or 7351 Yoshidamichi, an asteroid
 XB-1, Fondu fyre cement mixture
 XB1, a variant of the Daewoo Precision Industries K2 assault rifle

See also
Ikarie XB-1